A total solar eclipse will occur at the Moon's ascending node of the orbit on June 13, 2132. A solar eclipse occurs when the Moon passes between Earth and the Sun, thereby totally or partly obscuring the image of the Sun for a viewer on Earth. A total solar eclipse occurs when the Moon's apparent diameter is larger than the Sun's, blocking all direct sunlight, turning day into darkness. Totality occurs in a narrow path across Earth's surface, with the partial solar eclipse visible over a surrounding region thousands of kilometres wide. This is one of the solar eclipses occurring on Friday the 13th.

Duration 
Lasting a maximum of 6 minutes, 55.02 seconds, it will be the longest solar eclipse since the solar eclipse of July 11, 1991, which lasted for 6 minutes 53.08 seconds. At sunrise totality will last 3 minutes 8.2 seconds and at sunset totality will last 3 minutes 7.3 seconds.

Related eclipses

Saros 139

References

External links 
 NASA Solar eclipses: 2101 to 2200
 NASA graphics
 NASA googlemap of eclipse path

2132 06 13
2132 06 13
2132 06 13
22nd century in science
2130s